This is a list of FIPS 10-4 region codes from V-Z, using a standardized name format, and cross-linking to articles.

On September 2, 2008, FIPS 10-4 was one of ten standards withdrawn by NIST as a Federal Information Processing Standard. The list here is the last version of codes. For earlier versions, see link below.

VC: Saint Vincent and the Grenadines

VE: Venezuela

VM: Vietnam

WA: Namibia

WS: Samoa

WZ: Eswatini

YM: Yemen

ZA: Zambia

ZI: Zimbabwe

See also
 List of FIPS region codes (A-C)
 List of FIPS region codes (D-F)
 List of FIPS region codes (G-I)
 List of FIPS region codes (J–L)
 List of FIPS region codes (M-O)
 List of FIPS region codes (P-R)
 List of FIPS region codes (S–U)

Sources
 FIPS 10-4 Codes and history
 Last version of codes
 All codes (include earlier versions)
 Table to see the evolution of the codes over time
 Administrative Divisions of Countries ("Statoids"), Statoids.com

References

Region codes